The black buffalo (Ictiobus niger) is a North American species of freshwater fish in the Catostomidae or sucker family.  At 56 years old for one specimen's age, it is one of the longest-lived catostomids. Found in the Mississippi Basin and southern Great Lakes.  It was first discovered in Canada in the western end of Lake Erie and has been reported from Boston Creek.  The Tennessee distribution ranges from rivers and streams in the Cumberland Mountains, a few rivers in middle Tennessee, and in west Tennessee along the Mississippi River. The ecology of the species is quite similar to that of I. bubalus. I. niger has a ventrally positioned mouth, making the species’ diet benthic-oriented.  It has a distinct shape that mocks I. bubalus and I. cyprinellus, considering it a hybrid between the two species.

Geographic distribution
I. niger is found in large and small rivers in eastern North America from the Mississippi Basin to Canada.  In Canada, the species was first described in Lake Erie.  In the United States, the species is found in both small and large rivers in the basins of the Mississippi, Missouri, and Ohio as well as in southern Lake Michigan and Lake Erie.  Among others, it is native to Iowa, South Dakota and Minnesota; more southern states include eastern Texas and Oklahoma.

Ecology
The ecology of I. niger is most closely related to I. cyprinellus. Due to the ventrally positioned mouth, the diet is benthic-oriented, with the Asiatic clam being the principal food. Detritus and sand are also ingested and contribute  about 40% of the dietary volume. It is most commonly found in quiet, shallow waters. I. niger relies on benthic organisms more heavily than I. bubalus. I. niger feeds mostly from the bottom.

Life history
Members of Ictiobus are large, robust-bodied suckers adapted to large rivers. Currently recognized species are readily diagnosed by morphological characters, and the group is known from fossils dating back to the Miocene. I. niger is a spring spawner. They spawn in flooded areas and backwaters of sloughs and small to large rivers... Fertilized eggs are demersal and adhesive. I. niger grows fairly rapidly, averaging  after the first year, and is sexually mature at age 2. The spawning period could take days. Spawning fish remain in a state of excitement, and are unconcerned about unusual movements or disturbances. I. niger has been reported violently jumping and repressed eagerness while spawning. The fish do not seem to recover normal reaction to alarm until the spawning draws to an end. The black buffalo has a maximum longevity of at least 56 years as estimated by a thin-sectioned otolith from the Michigan State Record fish taken in 2018. This age is more than 30 years older than previously reported for this species' maximum longevity. Like bigmouth buffalo, the black buffalo is long-lived.

Relationship with people
No specific plan exists for protection for this species in Canada other than the Fisheries Act. However, I. niger is listed as of special concern in Kentucky, Mississippi, South Dakota, and West Virginia.  It has also been listed as protected in Wisconsin.  From 1957–59, only seven specimens were recorded in the Ohio River.  In 1968–69, only four specimens were captured. Threats and issues include loss, modification or fragmentation of large river habitat caused by dams in the Mississippi and Wisconsin Rivers.  Mistaken identity leads to the taking of this species in commercial fisheries.  The exotic bighead carp shares the habitat with I. niger and consumes large amounts of zooplankton, outcompeting I. niger for needed food. The IGFA all tackle world record for the species stands at 63lbs 6oz caught from the Mississippi River in Iowa in 1999.

Management recommendations
To ensure the long life and thriving reproduction of I. niger, protection and restoration of larger river habitat is needed.  Education of anglers, biologists, and the general public in taxonomy, systematics, and habitat use is needed.  The species presents special difficulties, due to natural hybridization, for both research and enforcement.  Dams need to be equipped with fish passages to connect fragmented habitats.  Invasive species that compete or degrade the habitat of native fishes need to be controlled.

References

Ictiobus
Fish described in 1819
Freshwater fish of North America
Taxa named by Constantine Samuel Rafinesque